Ergis Mersini (born 30 September 1988) is an Albanian professional footballer who plays as a left-back for Kosovan side Trepça'89.

Club career
In July 2013, Mersini joined Albanian First Division side Dinamo Tirana on a one-year contract.

On 23 January 2017, Mersini left Luftëtari Gjirokastër by terminating his contract by mutual consent. He departure was made de facto in the first days of January, where he was not called up in team's winter training camp on Antalya, Turkey, after being told by the coach Mladen Milinković that he was not in his plans for the second part of the season.

Three days later, however, Mersini joined Flamurtari Vlorë for the second part of 2016–17 season. He made his debut with the club on 28 January 2017 against Skënderbeu Korçë as Flamurtari slumped into a 1–0 away defeat. Mersini quickly established himself in the starting lineup and went on to play another 16 matches, all of them as starter, until the end of the season, as Flamutari barely avoided relegation by winning in the last match against Korabi Peshkopi.

On 28 June 2017, Mersini signed a new contract extension with Flamurtari until June 2018.

Honours
Luftëtari Gjirokastër
Albanian First Division: 2011–12, 2015–16

References

External links
Football Database profile

1988 births
Living people
Footballers from Gjirokastër
Albanian footballers
Association football defenders
KF Teuta Durrës players
Luftëtari Gjirokastër players
FK Dinamo Tirana players
Flamurtari Vlorë players
KF Vllaznia Shkodër players
KF Trepça'89 players
Kategoria Superiore players
Kategoria e Parë players
Football Superleague of Kosovo players
Albanian expatriate footballers
Expatriate footballers in Kosovo
Albanian expatriate sportspeople in Kosovo